Judith Pappas Zaffirini (born February 13, 1946) is an American politician serving as a Democratic member of the Texas State Senate from the 21st District, which includes her home city of Laredo in south Texas. On January 9, 2007, Zaffirini became the second in seniority in the 31-member Texas Senate, of which she has been a member since 1987. Zaffirini has been named among the "Top 100 Most Influential Hispanics in the United States" by Hispanic Business magazine. Zaffirini is the first Mexican American woman elected to the Texas Senate.

Background

Zaffirini is a graduate of the University of Texas at Austin. While she and her attorney-husband, Carlos M. Zaffirini Sr. (born 1943), were attending UT, they worked in the late 1960s on the staff of District 21 State Senator Wayne Connally, brother of Governor John B. Connally Jr. During this time, serious attention was focused on establishing a university in Laredo. Soon the satellite campus of Texas A&M University - Kingsville, then known as Texas A&I, opened in Laredo. In 1970, Laredo State University was launched with Billy F. Cowart as the president, and in 1993, Senator Zaffirini secured legislation creating the four-year Texas A&M International University on a separate campus off the Bob Bullock Loop. Zaffirini's work in the education field led to her being named "Laredoan of the year" in 2009 by the Laredo Morning Times.

Zaffirini studied two summers at Laredo Community College (then Laredo Junior College). On December 17, 2007, she was honored by the LCC board of trustees with its inaugural "Beacon Award", a creation from the college's sixtieth anniversary. According to LCC president Juan L. Maldonado, the award recognizes individuals whose altruistic efforts have improved and advanced the welfare of the Webb County community. Maldonado said that the beacon "evokes the flame of the lamp of learning, which represents the role of the individual in bringing enlightenment and hope to others. ... Senator Zaffirini embodies all of these admirable traits ... and make her the ideal recipient of this award." In 2004, LCC named its new south campus library in honor of Zaffirini.

In 1977, Zaffirini became an associate of the Women's Institute for Freedom of the Press (WIFP). WIFP is an American nonprofit publishing organization. The organization works to increase communication between women and connect the public with forms of women-based media.

She is also honored through the Zaffirini Elementary School, 5210 Santa Claudia Lane in Laredo, one of the campuses of the United Independent School District.

Elections
In 1986, Zaffirini defeated the late State Representative William N. "Billy" Hall Jr., in the Democratic runoff primary for state senator. She then defeated Republican attorney and businessman Bennie Walter Bock of San Antonio in the general election to succeed John Traeger, a Democrat from Seguin in Guadalupe County. From 1973 to 1983, before he switched parties Bock had been a Democratic member of the Texas House from New Braunfels in District 38.

Zaffirini has continued to defeat intraparty and interparty challengers in her Webb County-based district. In 1994, she won more than two thirds of the ballots cast in the general election against the Republican candidate, Fernando G. Cantu Jr. (1944-2016), 71,029 (68.5 percent to 32,624 (31.5 percent).

In the Democratic primary held on March 4, 2008, Zaffirini was to have faced San Antonio attorney Rene Barrientos (born January 25, 1954), but Barrientos withdrew from the race. His name, however, remained on the ballot, and he did some advertising. Zaffirini won the nomination, 108,572 votes (78.6 percent); Barrientos, 23,262 (21.4 percent).

In the general election held on November 4, 2008, Zaffirini carried all seventeen counties in the district to defeat Louis H. Bruni, the county judge from 2003 to 2006, a Laredo Democrat who switched temporarily to Republican affiliation on December 27, 2007. Though Bruni made a vigorous campaign effort, Zaffirini received 129,608 votes (68.2 percent) to his 55,363 (29.1 percent). Another 4,966 ballots (2.6 percent) were cast for Libertarian Barry L. Allison (born March 18, 1948) of San Antonio. After the loss to Zaffirini, Bruni returned to the Democratic Party and failed again in races for county judge and Precinct 1 commissioner.

In 2004, Zaffirini had easily defeated Bruni's brother, Raymond Anthony Bruni (born 1948), in the Democratic primary. In announcing his candidacy, Louis Bruni said that the historically Democratic district could be ripe for a partisan turnover. Prior to his judgeship, Bruni had been a member of the nonpartisan Laredo City Council. Bruni also said that his opposition to Zaffirini stems in part from a legal feud that he had with his brother prior to Raymond Bruni's campaign against the senator.

In the November 6, 2012, general election, Zaffirini handily defeated the Republican candidate, Grant Elliot Rostig (born c. 1958) of Lockhart in Caldwell County, a supporter of the Ron Paul presidential campaign, 2012, who was endorsed by the Republican Liberty Caucus. Zaffirini received 129,894 votes (67.6 percent) to Rostig's 56,032 (29.2 percent). The remaining 3.2 percent of the vote went to the Libertarian nominee, Joseph Morse.

Legislative tenure

Despite her Democratic heritage, Zaffirini is known for her ability to work across party lines, particularly her friendship with Republican former Lieutenant Governor David Dewhurst, the presiding officer of the state Senate, who lost the Republican primary for the U.S. Senate in 2012 to Ted Cruz and subsequently failed to win re-nomination in 2014 at the hands of State Senator Dan Patrick. Zaffirini had a similar close tie to the late Democratic Lieutenant Governor Bob Bullock, for whom the Laredo Loop 20 interchange is named. Undefeated at the polls, Zaffirini declared "voters are always well informed, and I believe they will decide to support me based on my record and seniority."

 

Zaffirini has a 100 percent voting record, having through 2013 cast more than fifty thousand consecutive votes since January 1987. She even once missed her son's graduation to maintain the record. She would also have a career perfect attendance record too except for the month of July 2003, when she joined her fellow Democrats who fled to Albuquerque, New Mexico, to prevent a quorum to halt Republican plans to re-redistrict the Texas congressional map. After three special legislative sessions, the GOP plan was adopted, but it was later altered by the United States Supreme Court. That change resulted in the defeat in 2006 of Republican U.S. Representative Henry Bonilla of San Antonio.

In 2007, Zaffirini led a successful movement to restore $154 million in community college funds vetoed by Governor Rick Perry.

In 2011, Zaffirini voted against the state appropriations bill because it reduced funding for public education by $5.4 billion, including $1.4 billion for targeted programs, such as pre-kindergarten expansion grants, one of her favorite programs. In 2013, Zaffirini will push for the issuance of tuition revenue bonds to fund capital construction projects on state college and university campuses, including TAMIU in Laredo.

In 2012, Lieutenant Governor Dewhurst removed Zaffirini from the chairmanship of the Senate Committee on Higher Education in favor of Kel Seliger, a Republican from Amarillo. Instead Zaffirni chairs the Senate Committee on Government Organization. She will remain a member of the higher education committee under Seliger and will continue as the co-chair of the Oversight Committee on Higher Education Governance Excellence and Transparency. Zaffirini said that she will continue to influence higher education policy "but the only difference is that the gavel won't be in my hand."

In July 2013, Zaffirini joined her Democratic colleagues in voting against Republican-sponsored legislation which passed the Senate, 19 to 11, to reduce from twenty-six to twenty weeks of gestation the maximum time limit during which a woman can procure an abortion. Zaffirini, who is anti-abortion, describes the new law as not anti-abortion, per se, but one that limits a woman's access to health care and fails to address the question of unintended pregnancies. Zaffirini said that she does "not believe that an unborn child can feel pain at twenty weeks. Nevertheless that had nothing to do with my position. ..." Zaffirini said, "Like it or not abortion is the law of the land, and because it is we must insure that women have access to safe and legal abortions. If they do not, then they will resort to coat hangers and self-aborting and illegal abortions, and that is wrong." Opponents of the law, such as Senator Royce West of Dallas, vowed a court challenge.

On March 8, 2017, Zaffirini was the only dissenter in an eight-to-one vote of the Senate State Affairs Committee of the bathroom bill, Senate Bill 6, introduced by her Republican colleague, Lois Kolkhorst of Brenham and strongly pushed by Lieutenant Governor Dan Patrick, the Republican presiding officer of the Senate. The bill would require persons to use public restrooms corresponding to their genitalia at birth. Strongly opposed by business and athletic interests, the measure is now pending before the Texas House of Representatives. Opponents of the measure have put their hopes in Moderate Republican Joe Straus of San Antonio, the House Speaker, who is known to be lukewarm or even hostile toward the measure.

In the 2017 legislative session, Zaffirini claimed her greatest numerical success record yet. Of the 168 bills that she introduced, 108 (64 percent) passed. Lawmakers introduced 6,631 bills but sent fewer, 1,211 (18 percent), to the governor than they have done since 1997 in the third year of the administration of Governor George W. Bush.

Civil lawsuits

In July 2013, Zaffirini was twice sued in Bexar County for alleged "gross mismanagement" of an estate valued at $150 million. The sisters, Josefina Alexander Gonzalez (1914-2014) and Delfina E. Alexander (died 2008), together owned about one thousand acres in South Texas. Between 1995 and 2002, five companies were organized to develop the property, but some of the businesses have long been inactive. The sisters further formed the Delfina and Josephina Alexander Family Trust designed to pass the proceeds of the holdings to Gonzalez's daughter, Rocio G. Guerra, and Gonzalez's two grandchildren. The second suit alleges that Zaffirini and two co-defendants, David H. Arredondo and Clarissa N. Chapa, committed tax fraud, forged documents, and paid themselves excessive fees in the amount of $420,000 for management of the Alexander holdings. The defendants are also accused of withholding money from the trust. Zaffirini's attorney-husband, Carlos Zaffirini Sr., said that Guerra and her children, have tried to break the trust on four occasions and that the basic issue centers on squabbling among the heirs over the collection of the money. Josefina Alexander Gonzales died in December 2014, five days before her 100th birthday. A temporary injunction against Zaffirini, Arredondo, and Chapa imposed by a trial court was reversed in November 2014 by the Texas Fourth Court of Appeals in San Antonio in an opinion written by Chief Justice Catherine Stone.

In August 2016, the longstanding case was resolved without going to trial. Zaffirini delivered $35 million in cash and land to three Alexander family trusts that benefit Rocio Guerra, Zaffirini's second cousin, and Guerra's two children. The three are the sole heirs to the Alexander estate. In return, Zaffirini will take control of nearly 450 acres of undeveloped real estate off Del Mar Boulevard. Zaffirini will continue to serve as an executor and trustee of certain entities of the Alexander estate.

Criticism of Donald Trump

On the occasion of Republican presidential candidate Donald Trump's visit to Laredo on July 23, 2015, Zaffrini wrote the lead column on the editorial page the next day in the Laredo Morning Times to question Trump's commitment to border issues.

Electoral history

Election history of Zaffirini since 1992.

2008

2004

2002

2000

1996

1994

1992

See also

 History of the Mexican-Americans in Texas

References

External links

 Profile at the Texas Senate
 Judith Zaffirini for Texas Senate
 Project Vote Smart - Senator Judith Zaffirini (TX) profile
 Follow the Money - Judith Zaffirini
 2006 2004 2002 2000 campaign contributions
 Archived Texas Senate Profile

1946 births
Living people
People from Laredo, Texas
Laredo Community College alumni
University of Texas at Austin alumni
University of Houston alumni
Democratic Party Texas state senators
Women state legislators in Texas
Hispanic and Latino American women in politics
American politicians of Mexican descent
20th-century American politicians
20th-century American women politicians
21st-century American politicians
21st-century American women politicians
Texas A&I University alumni